Guy St-Julien (born February 19, 1940) is a Canadian politician. He is a former director of human resources and a senior clerk. St-Julien was born in Val-d'Or, Quebec.

St-Julien was a member of the Liberal Party of Canada in the House of Commons of Canada, representing the riding of Abitibi—Baie-James—Nunavik from 2000 to 2004, and Abitibi as a Liberal from 1997 to 2000 and as a Progressive Conservative from 1984 to 1993.

He lost his seat (now called Nunavik—Eeyou) in the 2004 election to Bloc Québécois candidate Yvon Lévesque.

External links
 

1940 births
French Quebecers
Living people
Liberal Party of Canada MPs
Members of the House of Commons of Canada from Quebec
Progressive Conservative Party of Canada MPs
People from Val-d'Or
21st-century Canadian politicians